Allophylus hispidus is a species of plant in the family Sapindaceae. It is endemic to Sri Lanka.

References

Endemic flora of Sri Lanka
hispidus
Critically endangered plants
Taxonomy articles created by Polbot